Atagema albata is a species of sea slug or dorid nudibranch, a marine gastropod mollusc in the family Discodorididae.

Distribution 
This species was described from Victoria, Australia. It has also been reported from the Sunshine Coast, Queensland, Australia.

References

Discodorididae
Gastropods described in 1962